The Üç Şerefeli Mosque is a 15th-century Ottoman mosque in Edirne, Turkey.

History
The Üç Şerefeli Mosque was commissioned by Ottoman sultan Murad II (r. 1421–1444, 1446–1451), and built between 1438 and 1447. It is located in the historical center of the city, close to the Selimiye Mosque and Old Mosque. The name refers to unusual minaret with three balconies.

The architect of the mosque is not known. It is built of Burgaz limestone with a main dome that is 24 m in diameter. When first built the dome was the largest in any Ottoman building. The mosque was severely damaged by fire in 1732 and by an earthquake in 1748 but was repaired on the order of Mahmut I.

The two blue and turquoise underglaze-painted tile panels in the tympana of the windows were probably produced by the same group of tilemakers who had decorated the Yeşil Mosque (1419–21) in Bursa where the tiles are signed as "the work of the masters of Tabriz" (ʿamal-i ustadan-i Tabriz). The running pattern of the Chinese influenced floral border tiles is similar to those in the small Muradiye Mosque in Edirne.

In the Şakaiki Numaniye Taşköprüzade relates how 'Certain accursed ones of no significance' were burnt to death in front of the mosque by Mahmut Paşa who accidentally set fire to his beard in the process.

Architecture 
The Üç Şerefeli Mosque is one of the most important mosques of this period of early Ottoman architecture. It has a very different design from preceding mosques. The floor plan is nearly square but is divided between a rectangular courtyard and a rectangular prayer hall. The courtyard has a central fountain and is surrounded by a portico of arches and domes, with a decorated central portal leading into the courtyard from the outside and another one leading from the courtyard into the prayer hall. The prayer hall is centered around a huge dome which covers most of the middle part of the hall, while the sides of the hall are covered by pairs of smaller domes. The central dome, 24 meters in diameter (or 27 meters according to Doğan Kuban), is much larger than any other Ottoman dome built before this. On the outside, this results in an early example of the "cascade of domes" visual effect seen in later Ottoman mosques, although the overall arrangement here is described by Sheila Blair and Jonathan Bloom as not yet successful compared to later examples. The mosque has a total of four minarets, arranged around the four corners of the courtyard. Its southwestern minaret was the tallest Ottoman minaret built up to that time and features three balconies, from which the mosque's name derives. The mosque was heavily damaged by an earthquake in 1752 and partly reconstructed.

The overall form of the Üç Şerefeli Mosque, with its central-dome prayer hall, arcaded court with fountain, minarets, and tall entrance portals, foreshadowed the features of later Ottoman mosque architecture. It has been described as a "crossroads of Ottoman architecture", marking the culmination of architectural experimentation with different spatial arrangements during the period of the Beyliks and the early Ottomans. Kuban describes it as the "last stage in Early Ottoman architecture", while the central dome plan and the "modular" character of its design signaled the direction of future Ottoman architecture in Istanbul. Scholars have tried to suggest various possible sources of influence and inspiration for this design. Blair and Bloom suggest that it is a grander-scale version of the Saruhanid congregational mosque or Ulu Cami (1367) in Manisa, a city with which Murad II was familiar. Godfrey Goodwin suggests that all the elements needed for the design of the Üç Şerefeli Mosque were already present in the existing mosques of western Anatolia, such as the Ulu Cami of Manisa and the Isa Bey Mosque of Selçuk, but that they had simply not been united together in a single design. Kuban suggests that the mosque's spatial design evolved from the importance of the domed space commonly found in front of the mihrab in early Islamic architecture, as well as from the influence of earlier single-domed Ottoman mosques. Kuban also notes that the mosque, which is built in cut stone and makes use of alternating bands of coloured stone for some of its decorative effects, marks the decline of the use of alternating brick and stone construction seen in earlier Ottoman buildings.

Gallery

See also
 Islamic architecture
 List of mosques
 Ottoman architecture

References

Sources

External links

Üç Serefeli Camii, Archnet
Photographs taken by Dick Osseman

15th-century mosques
Ottoman architecture in Edirne
Mosque buildings with domes
Mosques in Edirne
Ottoman mosques in Edirne
Tourist attractions in Edirne
Mosques completed in 1447